There are two Derwent Reservoirs in England:

 Derwent Reservoir (Derbyshire)
 Derwent Reservoir (North East England) on the border between County Durham and Northumberland